

Prelude
In November 1532 Atahualpa, the king of the Inca Empire, had just had won a long civil war against his brother Huáscar and was on his way from the Northern city of Quito to the capital Cuzco. But in Cajamarca he was captured by Francisco Pizarro. Although he paid a huge ransom of gold and silver he was executed eight months later. His general Rumiñahui seized power in the Northern part of the empire.

Before departing to Cuzco in August 1533, Pizarro sent one of his lieutenants Sebastián de Belalcázar with a few men to his base San Miguel de Piura near the coast. When more and more Spaniards arrived at San Miguel, attracted by the Peruvian gold, Belalcázar decided to lead an expedition to Quito, where they expected to find more gold.

The battle
Rumiñahui rallied his forces and marched them south. Both forces met at a plain near Chimborazo. Neither the Spanish or the Incas had the upper hand at the beginning of the battle but then Rumiñahui's army started beating the Spanish back even though the Spanish possessed fire arms and cannon, when Belalcázar was about to retreat to avoid insurmountable casualties Chimborazo went into activity, startling the inca warriors that saw it as a bad omen and retreated. 

Rumiñahui decided to retreat from Quito. He took the treasures away and burned down the city. A year later, Rumiñahui was captured and submitted to questioning under duress (tortured) by the Spanish but he did not reveal the location of the temples' treasure.

Mount Chimborazo
Mount Chimborazo
Mount Chimborazo
Mount Chimborazo
1534 in South America
History of Ecuador